Aslan Khan Daghestani was an early 18th-century Safavid official. Of Lezgian origin, he served as a governor of Kuhgiluyeh (beglarbeg; 1702–1708) and of Astarabad (hakem) during the reign of king Sultan Husayn (1694–1722). He entered office in Astarabad in 1708/09, and already early on in his tenure, the province was threatened by Turkmen incursions aided by rebels from the town of Sayfja. Dismayed by the news, the Safavid government then sent Aslan Khan with 2,000 troops to deal with the enemy. 

According to Prof. Rudi Matthee, it is "likely" that he remained in office when his brother Fath-Ali Khan Daghestani served as grand vizier (1716–1720). His son, Mohammad Khan, became governor of Herat in 1708/9.

References

Sources
  
 

18th-century deaths
Safavid governors of Astarabad
Iranian people of Lezgian descent
Safavid governors of Kuhgiluyeh
Safavid generals
18th-century people of Safavid Iran